Pseudodalatias is an extinct genus of squaliform shark which existed in England, Italy and Spain during the Triassic period. It is placed in the monotypic family Pseudodalatiidae, and contains the two species Pseudodalatias barnstonensis and Pseudodalatias henarejensis.

References
A.TINTORI (1980) Teeth of the selachian genus Pseudodalatias Sykes, 1971 from the Norian (Upper Triassic) of  Lombardy. Riv.It.Paleont.Strat., v.86(1), 19–30, Milano

Triassic fish of Europe
Triassic sharks